Uzhamalackal  is a village in Thiruvananthapuram district in the state of Kerala, India.  Vijayakumar S is the present Agricultural Officer there.

Demographics
 India census, Uzhamalackal had a population of 21130 with 10256 males and 10874 females.

References

Villages in Thiruvananthapuram district